Rhizopogon alexsmithii is an ectomycorrhizal fungus in the order Boletales.  Named in honor of American mycologist Alexander H. Smith, it was described as new to science in 1975 by James Trappe. Alfredo Vizzini and Mirca Zotti transferred it to the genus Rhizopogon in 2010.

See also
List of fungi by conservation status

References

Rhizopogonaceae
Fungi described in 1817
Fungi of North America